

Classification 

The winning roster of Olimpija:
  Marjan Kandus
  Primož Brišnik
  Bogdan Müller
  Ivo Daneu
  Matija Dermastija
  Marko Vrhovec
  Janez Bajc
  Karel Povž
  Karel Kapelj
  Boris Kristančič
  Emil Logar
  Miha Lokar

Coach:  Boris Kristančič

Qualification in 1961-62 season European competitions 

FIBA European Champions Cup
 Olimpija (champions)

References

Yugoslav First Basketball League seasons